Joseph Edmund Batchelder [Win] (July 11, 1898 – May 5, 1989) was a relief pitcher in Major League Baseball who played from  through  for the Boston Braves.

In a three-season career, Batchelder posted a 1–0 record with a 5.66 ERA in 11 appearances, including one start and one complete game, giving up 13 earned runs on 26 hits and four walks while striking out six in  innings of work.

External links

Boston Braves players
Major League Baseball pitchers
Baseball players from Massachusetts
1898 births
1989 deaths